Millennium Hotel Taichung is a 24-storey,  skyscraper hotel completed in 2012 as 
Millennium Vee Hotel Taichung, is located in Taichung's 7th Redevelopment Zone, Xitun District, Taichung, Taiwan. Managed by the Millennium & Copthorne Hotels, the hotel is one of the top luxury hotels in Taichung.

Facilities
The five-star hotel has a total of 243 rooms including premium suites, themed restaurants, a café and a bar. Other facilities include a gym, club lounge, swimming pool, as well as meetings and events facilities.

Restaurants & Bars 
 Soluna - All Day Dining: Restaurant buffet serving a wide variety of both international and local flavors.
 Private Dining Room: Chinese restaurant featuring traditional Taiwanese and Cantonese cuisine.
 Lumi Bar: Lounge bar and café offering hot and cold beverages as well as light meals.
 The Prime - Grill & Lounge: Restaurant offering a variety of steak and seafood dishes.

See also
 Taichung's 7th Redevelopment Zone
 The Splendor Hotel Taichung
 Windsor Hotel Taichung
 National Hotel (Taiwan)

References

External links

Millennium Hotel Taichung Official Website (English) 
 Millennium Vee Hotel Taichung - Taichung Tourism Bureau 

2012 establishments in Taiwan
Buildings and structures in Taichung
Skyscraper hotels in Taichung
Hotel buildings completed in 2012
Taichung's 7th Redevelopment Zone